Peter John Susko (July 2, 1904 – May 22, 1978) was a professional baseball player.  He was a first baseman for one season (1934) with the Washington Senators.  For his career, he compiled a .286 batting average and two home runs in 224 at-bats, with 25 runs batted in.

He was born in Laura, Ohio and died in Jacksonville, Florida at the age of 73.

External links

1904 births
1978 deaths
Washington Senators (1901–1960) players
Major League Baseball first basemen
Baseball players from Ohio
Mobile Bears players
Montgomery Lions players
Pensacola Pilots players
Springfield Senators players
Birmingham Barons players
Atlanta Crackers players
Knoxville Smokies players
Albany Senators players
Hazleton Mountaineers players
Galveston Buccaneers players
Charlotte Hornets (baseball) players
Meridian Scrappers players